David Vega Hernández (born 23 June 1994) is a Spanish professional tennis player.

Vega Hernández has a career-high ATP singles ranking of World No. 403 achieved on 21 July 2014. He also has a career high ATP doubles ranking of World No. 30 achieved on 30 January 2023.

Professional career

2015: ATP debut in singles 
Vega Hernández made his ATP main draw debut at the 2015 Estoril Open in the singles draw, entering as a lucky loser.

2021: First ATP title and Top 100 debut in doubles 
Hernández won his first ATP doubles title at the 2021 Croatia Open Umag partnering Fernando Romboli. As a result, he made his top 100 debut on 26 July 2021 at World No. 98.

2022: New partnership & Four titles, Major debut & quarterfinal, top 35
In April, Vega Hernández won his second ATP 250 doubles title at the 2022 Grand Prix Hassan II alongside  new partner Rafael Matos.

At the 2022 BMW Open he reached his second final with Matos and third overall.

At the 2022 French Open on his Grand Slam debut the pair reached the third round with a win over Łukasz Kubot and Édouard Roger-Vasselin but not before defeating 13th seeded pair of Santiago Gonzalez and Andres Molteni. They reached the quarterfinals where they lost to 12th seeded pair of Marcelo Arevalo and Jean-Julien Rojer. As a result Vega Hernández reached the top 50 in the rankings.

Vega Hernández reached world No. 32 on 31 October 2022 following a fourth title for the season at the 2022 Sofia Open and a final showing at the ATP 500 2022 Rakuten Japan Open Tennis Championships with Matos.

2023: Top 30 debut
Following the 2023 Australian Open he reached the top 30 on 30 January 2023.

ATP career finals

Doubles: 7 (5 titles, 2 runner-ups)

Challenger and Futures finals

Singles: 7 (3–4)

Doubles: 71 (36–35)

Notes

References

External links
 
 

1994 births
Living people
Spanish male tennis players
21st-century Spanish people